Maksim Aleksandrovich Kulyomin (born 25 May 1989) is a Russian former footballer.

Club career
He made his debut in the Russian Premier League for Luch-Energiya on 16 November 2008 in a game against FC Spartak Moscow.

External links
  Player page on the official FC Luch-Energia Vladivostok site
 

1989 births
People from Ussuriysk
Sportspeople from Primorsky Krai
Living people
Russian footballers
Association football defenders
FC Luch Vladivostok players
Russian Premier League players
FC Sakhalin Yuzhno-Sakhalinsk players
FC Smena Komsomolsk-na-Amure players
FC Lokomotiv Moscow players